Rajiv Gandhi National Park may refer to any of the following national parks in India:

 Mukundara Hills National Park in Rajasthan
 Nagarhole National Park in Karnataka
 Orang National Park in Assam
 Rajiv Gandhi National Park (Rameswaram) in Andhra Pradesh